Taylor Dearden Cranston (born February 12, 1993) is an American actress. She played Ophelia in the MTV show Sweet/Vicious. She also played Chloe Lyman in the second season of the Netflix mockumentary American Vandal.

Early life 
Taylor Dearden Cranston was born in Los Angeles, California, on February 12, 1993, the daughter of actor Bryan Cranston and actress Robin Gale Dearden. In 2015, she graduated from the University of Southern California with a BA in theater.

Career 
In 2010, Dearden appeared in an episode of Breaking Bad called "No Más". From 2011 to 2016, she appeared in various short films.

From 2013 to 2014, Dearden portrayed the character McKenzie in two seasons of the web series 101 Ways to Get Rejected. The show was created and written by fellow USC student Susie Yankou and was directed by Mike Effenberger.

In 2016, Dearden was cast in the MTV TV show Sweet/Vicious, where she played the character Ophelia Mayer. Written and created by Jennifer Kaytin Robinson, the show was critically acclaimed for its portrayal of campus sexual assault. Despite being beloved by critics, with Dearden's work positively reviewed, it was canceled after one season.

In 2017, Dearden appeared in the film The Last Champion, which stars Cole Hauser as former Olympic wrestler John Wright.

In 2018, Dearden appeared in season two of the Netflix mockumentary American Vandal, where she played the character Chloe Lyman, acting alongside co-stars Tyler Alvarez, Griffin Gluck, and Travis Tope.

Filmography

Film

Television

Web

References

External links 
 
 

1993 births
21st-century American actresses
Actresses from Los Angeles
American film actresses
American people of Austrian-Jewish descent
American people of German descent
American people of Irish descent
American television actresses
Living people
USC School of Dramatic Arts alumni